Chasing the Dream may refer to:
 Chasing the Dream (album), 2014 album by Canadian heavy metal band Skull Fist
 The Cutting Edge: Chasing the Dream, 2008 romantic-comedy film
 Hank Aaron: Chasing the Dream, 1995 documentary film.
 Chasing the Dream: A Midlife Quest for Fame and Fortune on the Pro Golf Circuit, 1997 book by Harry Hurt III
 Chasing the Dream, a series produced by WNET

See also
 Chasing a Dream (Miles from Nowhere), 2009 telefilm
 Chasing Dreams (disambiguation)